Chihuahua is a resort (balneario) in the Maldonado Department of Uruguay.

Geography

To the east the resort Punta Ballena and to the west it borders the resort Ocean Park with the stream Arroyo del Portero separating it with the later. This stream carries the water of the Laguna del Sauce to the Río de la Plata.

Population
In 2011, Chihuahua had a population of 37 permanent inhabitants and 79 dwellings.
 
Source: Instituto Nacional de Estadística de Uruguay

See also 
 Naturism in Uruguay

References

External links

INE map of Sauce de Portezuelo, Ocean Park, Chihuahua and La Capuera
Official site of Playa Naturista Chihuahua

Populated places in the Maldonado Department
Beaches of Uruguay
Seaside resorts in Uruguay
Nude beaches
Naturism in Uruguay